Xavi Bou (born 1979) is a Spanish photographer whose work makes visible the flight paths of birds.

Biography 
Xavi Bou was born in Barcelona in 1979 and raised in Prat del Llobregat.

Bou's love for nature began through walks with his grandfather to the wetlands of Delta del Llobregat. 
In 2003 he graduated in geology at the University of Barcelona and in photography at Grisart International Photography School. After 2003 he focused on the world of fashion and advertising, working as a lighting technician for several photographers.

In 2009 he founded a photo retouching studio. Also for four years, he taught digital photography and post-production.

In 2012 he embarked on Ornitographies.

Ornitographies 
Bou focuses on bird flights capturing the contours drawn by birds in motion, or, as he says, "to make visible the invisible".

Bou says that he feels like a curator looking for hidden drawings that birds make in the sky with their flights.

Depending on the type of flight, the result could be regular patterns, like flamingoes in a V formation, or chaotic lines like swifts looking for insects in the air.

One of the favorite birds are clouds of starlings when they do their murmuration dance, especially when this group is behind attacked by hawks, as Bou says in an Atlas Obscura article: "I am passionate about the idea of how a sculptor, the hawk, shapes the shapes of starling clouds", he says.

With this project Bou created a multimedia project called Murmurations. Most of the images were made in Catalonia or in the area of the Iberian Peninsula. However, he also worked in Iceland and the United States.

Technique 
To show several seconds into a single image Bou uses the chronophotography technique. It is a technique created at the end of the 19th century, known through its main representatives: Eadweard Muybridge, Étienne-Jules Marey and Ottomar Anschütz. This consists of taking many photographs in a row and then combining them all into a single one.

In the first stage of the study, in which Bou invested five years, he used his own camera. Subsequently, to perfect the technique and photographs, he used professional digital cinema cameras. These cameras allow him to take 25 to 120 frames in a second at a high-resolution.

Exhibitions

Solo exhibitions
 Project presentation at the Observatorio, Barcelona, Spain, 2015
 Part of Leonardo, or the dream of ying exhibition at Museum Twentsewelle, Holland, 2017
 NPO Swiss Cancer League, Switzerland, 2017
 Mijas Contemporary Art Centre, Spain, 2017
 Fine Art Igualada Photo Festival, Spain, 2018
 Casa Golferich, Barcelona, Spain, 2018
 Festival Chapitre Nature, France, 2018
 Triple Space art Galery, Rusia, 2018
 Stream unconference, Greece, 2018
 VIPHOTO festival, Euskadi, 2018
 Punt De Vistes Art space, Barcelona, 2019
 Centro Fotográfico Alvarez Bravo, Oaxaca, México, 2019
 Université de Rennes, France, 2019/20
 Phyletisches Museum in Jena, Germany, 2020
 Mazier University, Saint Brieuc, 2020

Group exhibitions
 Freedom, Aperture Foundation, New York City 2017
 Bath House Cultural Center, Dallas, USA, 2019

References

External links 

Nature photographers
21st-century photographers
Spanish photographers
National Geographic photographers
1979 births
Living people